The Ib Award is one of the external awards presented occasionally by the Danish Film Academy at the annual Robert Awards ceremony. The award was first handed out in 2013, and is named after Danish producer .

Honorees 
 2013: 
 2015: 
 2016: Signe Byrge Sørensen
 2017: Jacob Jarek
 2018: Katja Adomeit

References

External links 
  

2013 establishments in Denmark
Awards established in 2013
Robert Awards